Lalinde is a commune in the Dordogne department in Nouvelle-Aquitaine in southwestern France. It lies on the river Dordogne and was enclosed within fortified walls of which little remains today. Lalinde station and Couze station have rail connections to Bordeaux, Bergerac and Sarlat-la-Canéda.

History
In its past, it was a strategically important military site being the first "English bastide town"; it suffered various sieges during the Hundred Years' War and again in 1562 and 1572 during the Wars of Religion.

The train station was built in 1877 and the bridge over the Dordogne River in 1880, though there are signs of earlier crossings including a ford going back to Roman times.

In 1944 the local Resistance paid a heavy price when on 21 June many of Lalinde's sons perished in the Mouleydier massacre.

On 11 July 1964, during the 19th stage of the Tour de France, the worst accident in the history of the Tour took place. A tanker driven by a gendarme ran into spectators at a narrow bridge crossing the Lalinde canal at Port-de-Couze. Nine people died and another 13 were injured. A stone marker commemorates the event.

Population

Twin towns 

  Lubbeek
  Linden
  Cuijk
  Lalín

See also 
Communes of the Dordogne department

References

External links

 St Colombe Church in Lalinde

Communes of Dordogne